Day One Christian Ministries, formerly known as the Lord's Day Observance Society (LDOS), is a Christian organisation based in the United Kingdom that lobbies for no work on Sunday, the day that many Christians celebrate as the Sabbath, a day of rest. This position is based on the fourth (by the Hebrew reckoning) of the Ten Commandments. Day One incorporates Day One Publications (its publishing arm) and the Daylight Christian Prison Trust.  

The Lord's Day Observance Society was founded by Joseph Wilson and Daniel Wilson in 1831. It became the most powerful sabbatarian organisation in England, opposed to Sunday newspapers, train travel, and mail delivery. According to Stephen Miller, their "clamor for change provoked a backlash", and there was conflict in Victorian England over this issue for the rest of the nineteenth century. LDOS later united with other sabbatarian organisations, including the Working Men's Lord's Day Rest Association (1920), the Lord's Day Observance Association of Scotland (1953), and the Imperial Alliance for the Defence of Sunday (1965).

See also
Blue law
Keep Sunday Special
Religion in the United Kingdom
Sabbath desecration
Sunday shopping

References

External links

Day One Publications, books published by the society

Sabbath in Christianity
Christian advocacy groups
1831 establishments in the United Kingdom
Religious organizations established in 1831